Hirvonen is a Finnish surname. Notable people with the surname include:

Elina Hirvonen (born 1975), Finnish writer and journalist
Heikki Hirvonen (1895–1973), Finnish biathlete
Mikko Hirvonen (born 1980), Finnish rally driver
Pasi Hirvonen (born 1988), Finnish ice hockey player
Raimo Hirvonen (born 1950), Finnish sport wrestler
Reino Antero Hirvonen (1908–1989), Finnish geodesist
Timo Hirvonen (born 1973), Finnish ice hockey player
Tomi Hirvonen (born 1977), Finnish ice hockey player

Finnish-language surnames